Stephen Pearl Andrews (March 22, 1812 – May 21, 1886) was an American libertarian socialist, individualist anarchist, linguist, political philosopher, outspoken abolitionist and author of several books on the labor movement and individualist anarchism.

Early life and work
Andrews was born in Templeton, Massachusetts on March 22, 1812, the youngest of eight children of the Reverend Elisha Andrews and his wife Ann Lathrop. He grew up thirty-five miles northeast in Hinsdale, New Hampshire. Andrews went to Louisiana at age 19 and studied and practiced law there. Appalled by slavery, he became an abolitionist. He was the first counsel of Mrs. Myra Clark Gaines in her celebrated suits. Having moved to Texas in 1839, Andrews and his family were almost killed because of his abolitionist lectures and had to flee in 1843. Andrews travelled to England, where he was unsuccessful at raising funds for the abolitionist movement back in the United States.

While in England, Andrews became interested in Isaac Pitman's new shorthand writing system and upon his return to the United States he taught and wrote about the shorthand writing system and devised a popular system of phonographic reporting. To further this, he published a series of instruction books and edited two journals, The Anglo-Saxon and The Propagandist. Andrews devised a "scientific" language he called Alwato in which he was wont to converse and correspond with pupils. At the time of his death, Andrews was compiling a dictionary of Alwato which was published posthumously. A remarkable linguist, he also became interested in phonetics and the study of foreign languages, eventually teaching himself "no fewer than 32" languages.

By the end of the 1840s, he began to focus his energies on utopian communities. Fellow individualist anarchist Josiah Warren was responsible for Andrew's conversion to radical individualism and in 1851 they established Modern Times in Brentwood, New York. He was elected an Associate Fellow of the American Academy of Arts and Sciences in 1846. In 1857, Andrews established Unity Home in New York City. By the 1860s, he was propounding an ideal society called pantarchy which is a society with a voluntary government strongly connected with a New Catholic Church and from this he moved on to a philosophy he called universology which stressed the unity of all knowledge and activities. He was also among the first Americans to discover Karl Marx and the first to publish his Communist Manifesto in the United States.

Andrews was one of the first to use the word scientology. The word is defined as a neologism in his 1871 book The Primary Synopsis of Universology and Alwato: The New Scientific Universal Language. In the 1870s, Andrews promoted Joseph Rodes Buchanan's psychometry besides his own universology predicting that a priori derived knowledge would supersede empirical science as exact science. Andrews was also considered a leader in the religious movement of spiritualism. Anarcho-syndicalist Rudolf Rocker called Andrews a significant exponent of libertarian socialism in the United States.

The sovereignty of the individual
Andrews talks in his writings about the sovereignty of the individual and how it relates to his political views. In The Science of Society, he says:

Andrews considered the sovereignty of the individual to be "the basis of harmonious intercourse amongst equals, precisely as the equal Sovereignty of States is the basis of harmonious intercourse between nations mutually recognizing their independence of each other."

Wage theory

Andrews supported a socialistic system of employment and wages based on labor notes. Andrews believed that in the capitalist system within which he was living individuals were not receiving a wage commensurate with the amount of labor they exerted, saying:

For Andrews, to be paid "justly" was to be paid according to the "Cost Principle" which held that individuals should be paid according to the amount of labor they exert rather than according to the benefit that another receives from that labor (the latter being called the "Value Principle"). To help make this simple, like Josiah Warren, he advocated an economy that uses labor notes. Labor notes are a form of currency marked in labor hours (adjusted for different types of labor based on their difficulty or repugnance). In this way, it is not how much the employer values the employee's labor that determines the employee's pay, but simply how much the employee has labored. For similar reasons, Andrews did not believe people should be paid interest for loaning capital. In other words, he did not see the loaning of capital as requiring any labor or deprivation on the part of the loaner. He insisted that the benefit received from goods or labor is not a just measure of price, writing:

Andrews was following Warren's labor theory of value and hence Andrews' individualist anarchism is considered a form of economic mutualism.

Bibliography
 The Phonographic Reader: A Complete Course of Inductive Reading Lessons in Phonography (1846), with Augustus Boyle
 Cost the Limit of Price (1851)
 The Constitution of Government in the Sovereignty of the Individual (1851)
 The Science of Society (1851)
 The Sovereignty of the Individual (1853)
 Discoveries in Chinese or the Symbolism of the Primitive Characters (1854)
 Principles of Nature, Original Physiocracy, the New Order of Government (1857)
 The Pantarchy (1871)
 The Primary Synopsis of Universology and Alwato: The New Scientific Universal Language (1871)
 The Basic Outline of Universology (1872)
 The Primary Grammar of Alwato (1877)
 The Labor Dollar (1881)
 Elements of Universology (1881)
 The New Civilization (1885)

Notes

Further reading

External links
 
 

1812 births
1886 deaths
19th-century American journalists
19th-century American male writers
19th-century American non-fiction writers
American abolitionists
American anarchists
American magazine editors
American male journalists
American male non-fiction writers
American political philosophers
American political writers
American spiritualists
Anarchist writers
Fellows of the American Academy of Arts and Sciences
Free love advocates
Individualist anarchists
Libertarian socialists
Linguists from the United States
Mutualists
People from Templeton, Massachusetts
Philosophy writers
Writers from Massachusetts